Olosega may refer to one of multiple places in American Samoa:

 Ofu-Olosega, twin islands in the Manuʻa Islands Group
 Olosega (village), located in Ofu-Olosega
 Swains Island, an island disputed between the United States and Tokelau

American Samoa